Doe Boy may refer to:

The Doe Boy, a 2001 film written and directed by Randy Redroad
"Doe Boy Fresh", a song by Three 6 Mafia
Doe Boy (rapper), American rapper and songwriter

See also
Doughboy (disambiguation)